Mohammad Shaher Hussein (born March 3, 1990 in Russeifa) is a Jordanian professional basketball player who currently plays for Al Ahli of the Jordanian Premier Basketball league.  He also is a member of the Jordan national basketball team.

Hussein competed with the Jordanian team for the first time at the 2010 FIBA World Championship, playing center of the bench for the squad. In addition, he participated with the team in the  Asian cup in 2017, and in the World Cup in 2019.

References

1990 births
Living people
Jordanian men's basketball players
Basketball players at the 2010 Asian Games
Basketball players at the 2014 Asian Games
Centers (basketball)
2010 FIBA World Championship players
Asian Games competitors for Jordan
2019 FIBA Basketball World Cup players